Superior is a 2021 American drama film directed by Erin Vassilopoulos in her feature-length directorial debut, based on her 2015 short film of the same name. The film was co-written by Erin Vassilopoulos and Alessandra Mesa. The film stars Alessandra Mesa and Ani Mesa (reprising their roles from the short), Pico Alexander and Jake Hoffman.

The film held its world premiere at the 2021 Sundance Film Festival on January 30, 2021 and received a theatrical release in the United States on March 25, 2022 by Factory 25.

Premise
On the run, Marian returns to her hometown to hide out with her identical twin sister, Vivian, and in doing so alters the trajectory of both their lives.

Cast
The cast include:
 Alessandra Mesa as Marian
 Anamari Mesa as Vivian
 Pico Alexander as Robert
 Jake Hoffman as Michael
 Stanley Simons as Miles
 Christopher Dylan White as Dean
 Cara Ronzetti as Sasha
 Marcus Thompson Jr. as Club Bouncer

Release
The film premiered at the 2021 Sundance Film Festival on January 30, 2021. Visit Films then acquired the film's international sales rights, while Creative Artists Agency acquired its US sales rights. Factory 25 later acquired the film's distribution rights and released it on March 25, 2022 at BAM Cinemas in New York followed by a nationwide expansion.

Reception
 

Jessica Klang of Variety wrote "It might all get too pastiche-y, except that Vassilopoulos is quietly confident in the artificiality of her approach and leans into it, with mordant poker-faced wit and defiant stylishness that give us ample reason to take the twin trope out for another twisty turn around the block. It’s about blurred lines, collapsing identities and merging subjectivities, but the sly, slick little "Superior" knows just who it is."

Nick Allen of RogerEbert.com wrote "It's the kind of movie in which you can only imagine the vision boards and scrapbooks and planning that went into pre-production. Along with the rich color palette from the film stock, you want to love "Superior" based on such a visual commitment. But while that intention sucks you in, the story leaves you floundering."

References

External links
 
 

2021 films
2021 drama films
2021 independent films
American drama films
American independent films
Films about twins
Films about rape
Features based on short films
2020s English-language films
2020s American films